The 1897 Petersfield by-election was held on 8 June 1897 after the death of the incumbent Conservative MP William Wickham.  The seat was retained by the Conservative candidate William Graham Nicholson.

References 

By-elections to the Parliament of the United Kingdom in Hampshire constituencies
June 1897 events
Petersfield
1897 elections in the United Kingdom
1897 in England
19th century in Hampshire